APTIS was the Accountancy and Passenger Ticket Issuing System used on the British Rail/National Rail network until 2007. It was originally called "Advanced Passenger Ticket Issuing System" as it was being developed at the time of the Advanced Passenger Train.

It was widely known as the All-Purpose Ticket-Issuing System, a description which was used during the development of the prototype devices.

It led to the introduction, on the national railway, of a new standardised machine-printable ticket, the APTIS ticket, which replaced the Edmondson railway ticket first introduced in the 1840s.

Overview
APTIS issued impact printed tickets on credit-card sized card ticket stock, with a magnetic stripe on the centre of the reverse which could be encoded to operate ticket barriers; it could also use plain non-magnetic ticket stock.

APTIS could issue receipts for passengers paying by debit card or credit card. These receipts were a combination of a transparent carbonless copy paper top copy, for the customer; and a backing card, for retention by British Rail. The customer signed the receipt, handed it back; and, in return, was given the signed top copy and the train tickets.

Adoption by British Rail
APTIS was derived from a private venture ticketing system, the General Purpose ticket-issuing system, developed by Thorn EMI in 1978. It had 25 kB of memory.

British Rail invited 23 firms to tender for a ticket-issuing system and Thorn EMI was successful. The first prototype was installed at Portsmouth & Southsea on 11 November 1982.

APTIS, along with the portable system PORTIS, was adopted as part of British Rail's £31 million investment, which was authorised in 1983. The production APTIS machines had 300 kB of memory; this could be upgraded to 500 kB.

Some 2,971 APTIS machines were scheduled to be installed at 1,600 staffed British Rail stations between August 1985 and September 1987.

Phase-out of Edmondson tickets
The first production APTIS tickets were issued in October 1986 at stations including Didcot Parkway and Abbey Wood; the official launch was by Transport Minister David Mitchell at the British Rail Travel Centre, Regent Street, London, on 18 November 1986. The first ticket was sold at Benfleet in January 1987.

In 1988, the last of British Rail's Edmondson printing presses, located at the Paper and Printing Centre, Crewe, shut down. The last station to sell Edmondson tickets prior to full APTIS conversion was Emerson Park, on Network SouthEast's Romford to Upminster Line, on 29 June 1989.

Phase-out of APTIS
APTIS survived in widespread use for twenty years, but in the early 2000s was largely replaced by more modern PC based ticketing systems although some APTIS were modified as APTIS-ANT (with no obvious difference to the ticket issued) Oyster card compatible machines in the Greater London area. The last APTIS machines were removed at the end of 2006 as there was no option to upgrade for accepting Chip and PIN credit-card payments. The last APTIS-ANT ticket to be issued in the UK using one of the machines was at Upminster station on 21 March 2007.

References

External links
 List of known APTIS machines as of 2004, with name and numbering variants and dates of installation (by route)- archived 23 July 2018 from the original

See also
 APTIS ticket features
 PORTIS

British Rail fares and ticketing
Fare collection systems in the United Kingdom
Public transport information systems
Travel technology